Secretariat-Chancellery was a central government department in several dynasties in imperial China and Korea. It was created in the Tang dynasty by combining the Secretariat and the Chancellery. It was a particularly important office in late Tang, the Song dynasty, and Goryeo.

References 

 
 

Government of Imperial China
Government of the Tang dynasty
Government of the Song dynasty
Government of Goryeo